Les Cabrils station (French: Gare des Cabrils) is a French train station on , located at Les Cabrils, in the Roqueredonde commune, in the Hérault department, in Occitanie.

It was put into service 1874, by the Compagnie des chemins de fer du Midi et du Canal latéral à la Garonne.

It is an SNCF passenger stop, served by the TER Occitanie service.

Railway location 

A transit station, it has a platform served by a single-track railway.

History 
It was established in a place called "des Cabrils"  (goat in patois).

In 2014, the passenger stop was classified as a local interest passenger station (SNCF category C : less than 100 000 travellers a year from 2010 to 2011), which has a single track platform.

It is the least frequented active SNCF passenger station, with only 14 boardings recorded in 2015.

Station information 
Operating as an SNCF railway stop, it is an unmanned, open air shelter. As of 2021, SNCF confirms the station has an automatic regional rail ticket dispenser and is handicapped accessible.

Area served 
Les Cabrils is served by TER Occitanie trains running between Béziers - , or Millau. It serves residents of the valley as a transportation link to the larger towns in the area 

Travel blogger The Tim Traveller visited the station in February 2021, noting there appears to have been a second track and a passing loop at the location, long since removed. Two trains in each direction travel to the location. The open-air shelter was noted to have a timetable, onwards travel information and a help point/ emergency telephone. Even though the shelter is outdoors, one was legally required to wear a mask against COVID-19 while at the SNCF station. A return ticket costs one Euro as the line is heavily subsidized by the regional government. The location was noted as being very scenic and people-free, notwithstanding the global pandemic.

The location of the stop in the middle of nature, perhaps of interest to local hikers going to the Monts d'Orb, the Causse de Gabriac and the Escandorgue plateau,  is in an otherwise "illogical" place.

Marianne magazine featured the site in a July 2020 article, calling it "the most deserted station in France" and confirming how little-used the station is, even if it serves a somewhat-limited function, allowing residents of the largely rural area to access larger urban centers for shopping or other needs.

Railway Heritage 
The former passenger station building has been turned into a private residence.

See also 
 List of SNCF stations in Occitanie

References

External links 

Railway stations in Hérault